Save Me is an American sitcom television series starring Anne Heche as Beth Harper, a woman who, after nearly choking to death on a sandwich, becomes a direct pipeline to God. NBC placed a 13-episode series order in May 2012. It debuted on Thursday, May 23, 2013, at 8:00 p.m. Eastern/7:00 p.m. Central and ended on June 13, 2013, after the seventh episode.

Cast
 Anne Heche as Beth Harper
 Michael Landes as Tom Harper
 Alexandra Breckenridge as Carly Brugano
 Heather Burns as Jenna Derring
 Madison Davenport as Emily Harper
 Diedrich Bader as Elliot Tompkins
 Joy Osmanski as Maggie Tompkins
 Stephen Schneider as Pete Dennings

Episodes

Controversy
Censorship advocacy group One Million Moms (part of the American Family Association) complained about Save Me's content in June 2013, accusing it of being anti-Christian, while focusing its complaints on the character of Beth. The group urged others to protest to NBC to cancel the show.

References

External links

2010s American single-camera sitcoms
2013 American television series debuts
2013 American television series endings
English-language television shows
NBC original programming
Television series by Sony Pictures Television
Fiction about God
Television shows set in Ohio